"So Said Kay" is an EP by The Field Mice.  It was released as a 10" vinyl record.

It was also the very first EP release (as opposed to mini-album) by Sarah Records that was issued as a 10-inch format, because the band wanted to release the five songs on one single vinyl record as opposed to previously spread across two 7-inch vinyl records (as in 1989's "The Autumn Store, Part 1 and 2").

This 1990 EP showcases an even more melancholic/romantic side to the songwriting of chief Field Mice Bobby Wratten and Michael Hiscock, featuring some of their most poignantly yearning lyrics and instrumentation coupled with a glistening, almost crystalline, production by Ian Catt. It's often regarded as one of the finest recordings from the band, whose short life only extended to one more EP (1991's "Missing The Moon") and album ("For Keeps" released the same year) before they disbanded amid some considerable acrimony during a short UK tour.

Track listing
10" EP (SARAH 038)
 "Landmark" - 5:08
 "Quicksilver" - 5:02
 "Holland Street" - 2:52
 "Indian Ocean" - 5:04
 "So Said Kay" - 5:54

1990 EPs
Sarah Records albums
The Field Mice albums